is the debut studio album by Japanese singer Chisato Moritaka, released on July 25, 1987 by Warner Pioneer. It was produced by Yūzō Shimada, who also produced albums by Akina Nakamori, Naomi Tamura, and Aco. At the time of the album's recording, Moritaka had not started to write songs; instead, the album's songs were written by several composers such as Hiromasa Ijichi, Hideo Saitō, and Shingo Kanno (of the band Orquesta de la Luz).

The album peaked at No. 21 on Oricon's albums chart and sold over 43,000 copies.

Track listing

Personnel 
 Chisato Moritaka – vocals, piano (B2), Fender Rhodes (A1), keyboard (B4)
 Hideo Saitō – guitar (A2, B1, B4), backing vocals (A2, B1, B4)
 Akira Wada – guitar (A3)
 Makoto Matsushita – guitar (B2)
 Kazuhiko Iwami – guitar (A1, B3)
 Ken Shima – keyboards (A3, B2)
 Hiromichi Tsugaki – keyboards (A4, A5)
 Nobita Tsukada – keyboards (A2, B1, B4)
 Yasuhiko Fukuda – keyboards (B4)
 Kenji Takamizu – bass (A3)
 Yasuo Tomikura – bass (B2)
 Hiroshi Sawada – bass (A1, B3)
 Chiharu Mikuzugi – bass (B4)
 Shuichi "Ponta" Murakami – drums (A3)
 Eiji Shimamura – drums (B2)
 Reuben Tsujino – drums (B4)
 Mansaku Kimura – drums (A1, B3)
 Ryo Saito – percussion (A2, B1)
 Carlos Kanno – percussion (A1, A3, B3)
 Nobu Saitō – percussion (B2)
 Kazuo Kamada – saxophone (A1, B3)
 Shigeo Fuchino – saxophone (A3, A4)
 Kōyō Murakami – trombone (B3)
 Harumi Mita – trombone (A4)
 The Three Pinkies – backing vocals (A1, A3, A4, A5)
 Yukari Fujiu – backing vocals (B4)
 Hiromasa Ijichi – backing vocals (B3)
 Maeda Strings – string orchestra (A3)
 Tomoda Strings – string orchestra (B2)
 Tomoaki Arima – synthesizer programming (A1, A4, A5, B3)
 Takanori Umeno – synthesizer programming (A3, B2)

Charts

References

External links 
 
 
 

1987 debut albums
Chisato Moritaka albums
Japanese-language albums
Warner Music Japan albums